Rasmus Wikström (born 18 March 2001) is a Swedish professional footballer who plays for SønderjyskE, on loan from Danish Superliga club Brøndby IF as a centre-back.

Career

IFK Göteborg
Wikström started playing football for Partille IF, before joining the IFK Göteborg academy at age 13. Both his uncle Peter "Erra" Eriksson and his grandfather Per-Erik "Perra" Eriksson have previously played for the club.

Wikström made his senior debut for IFK Göteborg on 11 June 2018 in an 8–1 win over a selected team from Dalarna in a friendly match at Åvallen in Nyhammar. In December 2018, Wikström signed a three-year professional contract which saw him permanently promoted to the first team. Wikström made his Allsvenskan debut on 13 July 2019 in a 1–1 draw against Falkenbergs FF, where he came on as a substitute in overtime for Victor Wernersson. In a match against Falkenbergs FF on 12 August 2019, Wikström made his debut from the start, but was forced off after only 4 minutes with a serious anterior cruciate ligament injury.

AFC Eskilstuna (loan)
In March 2021, Wikström signed a one-season loan deal with AFC Eskilstuna competing in Superettan. He made his debut as a starter for the club on 12 April in a 0–0 draw against Västerås SK. He finished his tenure with the club with 11 appearances.

Brøndby
On 29 July 2021, Wikström signed a four-year contract with defending Danish Superliga champions Brøndby, for an undisclosed fee. In September 2021, he suffered a shoulder injury, sidelining him for the rest of the year. On 16 June 2022 it was confirmed, that Wikström would spend the upcoming 2022-23 season on loan at newly relegated Danish 1st Division club SønderjyskE, to gain some experience.

Honours
IFK Göteborg
Svenska Cupen: 2019–20

References

External links 

2001 births
Living people
Swedish footballers
Swedish expatriate footballers
Sweden youth international footballers
Association football defenders
Footballers from Gothenburg
Allsvenskan players
Superettan players
Danish Superliga players
IFK Göteborg players
AFC Eskilstuna players
Brøndby IF players
SønderjyskE Fodbold players
Expatriate men's footballers in Denmark
Swedish expatriate sportspeople in Denmark